Shivaji Kamble was a member of the 11th Lok Sabha & 13th Lok Sabha of India. He represented the Osmanabad constituency of Maharashtra and was a member of the Shiv Sena .

References

India MPs 1996–1997
India MPs 1999–2004
Marathi politicians
Shiv Sena politicians
Lok Sabha members from Maharashtra
People from Osmanabad
Year of birth missing
Possibly living people